The 2015 Weber State Wildcats football team represented Weber State University in the 2015 NCAA Division I FCS football season. The Wildcats were led by second year head coach Jay Hill, played their games at Stewart Stadium and were members of the Big Sky Conference. They finished the season 6–5, 5–3 in Big Sky play to finish in a four way tie for fourth place.

Schedule

Despite also being a member of the Big Sky Conference, the game with Sacramento State on September 19 is considered a non conference game.

Game summaries

at Oregon State

at North Dakota State

Sacramento State

at Northern Colorado

Southern Utah

at Montana

North Dakota

at Northern Arizona

at Eastern Washington

UC Davis

Idaho State

References

Weber State
Weber State Wildcats football seasons
Weber State Wildcats football